The annual Prague Pride was established in 2011. Prague is also a host of the Mezipatra Queer Film Festival.

According to Frommer's, the Vinohrady neighborhood is "particularly gay-friendly". Lonely Planet says, "Prague is a relatively tolerant destination for gay and lesbian travellers".

References

Culture in Prague
LGBT culture in the Czech Republic